In mathematics and physics, acceleration is the rate of change of velocity of a curve with respect to a given linear connection. This operation provides us with a measure of the rate and direction of the "bend".

Formal definition
Consider a differentiable manifold  with a given connection .

It is a covariant derivative along , and it is often denoted by

With respect to an arbitrary coordinate system , and with  being the components of the connection (i.e., covariant derivative ) relative to this coordinate system, defined by

for the acceleration vector field  one gets:

The concept of acceleration is a covariant derivative concept. In other words, in order to define acceleration an additional structure on  must be given.

See also
Acceleration
Covariant derivative

Notes

References

Differential geometry
Manifolds